Franklin Township is one of twelve townships in Harrison County, Indiana, United States. As of the 2010 census, its population was 4,104 and it contained 1,676 housing units.

Geography
The streams of Lazy Creek, Little Indian Creek, Smith Creek and Woertz Creek run through this township.

Cities and towns
 Lanesville

Unincorporated towns
 Breckenridge
 Utan
(This list is based on USGS data and may include former settlements.)

Adjacent townships
 Georgetown Township, Floyd County (northeast)
 Franklin Township, Floyd County (east)
 Posey Township (southeast)
 Webster Township (southwest)
 Harrison Township (west)
 Jackson Township (northwest)

Cemeteries
The township contains one cemetery, Lanesville.

Major highways
 Interstate 64
 Indiana State Road 62
 Indiana State Road 64

Airports and landing strips
 Greenridge KLA Airport
 Lanesville Skyways Airport

References
 
 United States Census Bureau cartographic boundary files

External links
 Indiana Township Association
 United Township Association of Indiana

Townships in Harrison County, Indiana
Townships in Indiana